Barbara Parkins (born May 22, 1942) is a Canadian-American former actress, singer, dancer and photographer.

Early life
Parkins was born in Vancouver, British Columbia.  At the age of 16, she and her adoptive mother moved to Los Angeles, where she enrolled at Hollywood High School and studied acting, tap, ballet and fencing at the Falcon School, where her mother played the piano.

Parkins worked as an usher in a cinema to pay for drama lessons.

Professional life
Parkins began her career as a backup singer and dancer in the nightclub acts of stars like comedian George Burns. She made her film debut in the 1961 low-budget crime caper 20,000 Eyes, and guest-starred in television series such as Leave It to Beaver, The Untouchables, Perry Mason and The Wide Country.

Parkins was involved in two of the most highly publicized projects of the 1960s, the ABC primetime serial Peyton Place, and the film adaptation of Jacqueline Susann's best-selling novel, Valley of the Dolls.

In Peyton Place, Parkins received lead billing for her role as small-town bad girl Betty Anderson. The character was scripted to die in a car crash six weeks into the season, but audience reaction to Parkins was overwhelmingly favorable and her character was kept in the story line. In a late-1965 interview, the actress said she was lucky to have the role of Anderson, calling her character the "salt and pepper in the stew".

Parkins was the only female star nominated for an award throughout the run of the series (1964–1969). In 1966, she was nominated for an Emmy Award as Lead Actress in a Drama Series, but lost to Barbara Stanwyck for The Big Valley. Parkins said while losing the award was painful, she was glad to have lost it to Stanwyck instead of Anne Francis, who was also nominated and whose work Parkins thought was "unfeminine".

Following the close of Peyton Place, producer Paul Monash developed a spin-off series, The Girl from Peyton Place, for Parkins. However, when co-star Ryan O'Neal, who played her husband, declined to participate, the project was shelved.

In Valley of the Dolls, Parkins played Anne Welles, a character based on author Susann. The Welles character was described as "the good girl with a million-dollar face and all the bad breaks". Although the film was trashed by the critics, it was a commercial success and became a cult classic.

After visiting London in 1968 to be a bridesmaid in the wedding of Valley of the Dolls co-star Sharon Tate and director Roman Polanski, Parkins moved to England, where she starred in several productions, including Puppet on a Chain, Shout at the Devil, and The Mephisto Waltz. Parkins said she moved to London because it was relaxed and simple, and she loved its traditions.

Parkins posed for nude pictorials in the May 1967, February 1970 and May 1976 editions of Playboy magazine.

In the 1970s and 1980s, Parkins appeared on American television in series that included Jennie: Lady Randolph Churchill, Captains and the Kings and The Testimony of Two Men, Fantasy Island, The Love Boat, Hotel, and Vega$. She also appeared in television movies, including To Catch a King, in which she portrayed the Duchess of Windsor, and opposite Sharon Stone in Calendar Girl Murders.

Parkins returned to the role of Betty Anderson in Peyton Place: The Next Generation (1985), a one-shot sequel to the series.

In 1991, Parkins starred in Canadian mystery series Scene of the Crime. She appeared in two Susann-inspired projects, the biography Scandalous Me and a segment of the Lifetime series Intimate Portrait.

In 2006, Parkins participated with Ted Casablanca on the audio commentary for the DVD release of Valley of the Dolls.

While filming Valley of the Dolls, Parkins met photographer Edward Steichen, a friend of the movie's cinematographer, and was influenced to begin a lifetime career in photography. She is also an advocate for endangered wildlife.

Personal life
In the late 1960s, Parkins was linked to several men, including Omar Sharif, Adam West, David Hedison and Marcel Marceau, but insisted most of the stories were made up by gossip magazines.

Parkins moved to France in the 1970s where she married, and in the late 1980s adopted her only child. Parkins and her husband divorced.

Filmography
Sources:Terrace, Vincent. Encyclopedia of Television Series, Pilots and Specials: 1974-1984 (1985), Verlag für die Deutsche Wirtschaft AG. , pp. 34, 75, 264, 409Internet Movie Database listing, Parkins imdb.com,  retrieved January 26, 2010

Films

TV series

TV guest appearances

Notes

References
 Brooks, Tim and Marsh, Earle. The Complete Directory to Prime Time Network and Cable TV Shows, 1946-Present (2007). Random House, Inc., pp 220, 1077, 1201
 Newcomb, Horace. Encyclopedia of Television (2004). CRC Press. ,  pp. 1754–1756

External links

 
 
 
Barbara Parkins Photography at CeLaVie
Barbara Parkins Photography Collection at 100Prints.co.uk

1942 births
Living people
Actresses from Vancouver
American expatriates in France
American expatriates in England
Canadian expatriate actresses in the United States
Canadian expatriates in France
Canadian expatriates in England
Canadian film actresses
Canadian television actresses
People from Greater Los Angeles